Paula Myllyoja (born 20 April 1984) is a Finnish footballer who plays as a goalkeeper for Serie A club A.S.D. Pink Sport Time and the Finland women's national football team. She has appeared in two matches for Finland, with one appearance each at the 2019 and 2020 Cyprus Women's Cup. She has previously played for Finnish clubs PK-35 Vantaa and Åland United.

References

1984 births
Living people
Women's association football goalkeepers
Finnish women's footballers
Finland women's international footballers
Expatriate women's footballers in Italy
Finnish expatriate sportspeople in Italy
Serie A (women's football) players
Kansallinen Liiga players
A.S.D. Pink Sport Time players
PK-35 Vantaa (women) players
FC Honka (women) players
Åland United players